Chishma-Burayevo (Şişmä-Boray) is a rural locality (a village) in Tazlarovsky Selsoviet, Burayevsky District, Bashkortostan, Russia. The population was 140 as of 2010. There are seven streets.

Geography 
Chishma-Burayevo is located 17 km northeast of Burayevo (the district's administrative centre) by road. Novotazlarovo is the nearest rural locality.

References 

Rural localities in Burayevsky District